"O What a King" is a song by American contemporary Christian music singer Katy Nichole, released on October 21, 2022, as a standalone single. Nichole co-wrote the song with Brandon Heath and Jeff Pardo.

"O What a King" peaked at number one on both the US Hot Christian Songs chart and on the Bubbling Under Hot 100 chart.

Composition

Commercial performance
"‎O What a King" made its debut at number 40 on the US Christian Airplay chart dated December 3, 2022. The song peaked at number 21 on the Christian Airplay chart.

"‎O What a King" debuted at number 30 on the US Hot Christian Songs chart dated December 10, 2022, The song peaked at number 14 on the Hot Christian Songs chart.

Music videos
Katy Nichole released the official lyric video of "O What a King" through her YouTube channel on October 21, 2022. Worship Together published the  acoustic performance video of "O What a King" via YouTube on December 7, 2022.

Track listing

Charts

Release history

References

External links
 

2022 singles
2022 songs
Katy Nichole songs
Songs written by Katy Nichole
Songs written by Brandon Heath
Songs written by Jeff Pardo